The 2010–11 La Liga season (known as the Liga BBVA for sponsorship reasons) was the 80th since its establishment. The campaign began on 28 August 2010 and ended on 21 May 2011. A total of 20 teams contested the league, 17 of which already contested in the 2009–10 season and three of which were promoted from the Segunda División. In addition, a new match ball – the Nike Total 90 Tracer – served as the official ball for all matches.

Defending champions Barcelona secured their third-consecutive and 21st La Liga title after a 1–1 tie with Levante on 11 May 2011. The result gave Barcelona a 6-point lead with two matches remaining which, combined with their better head-to-head record with Real Madrid, ensured that they finished top of the table. Barcelona led the table since defeating Madrid 5–0 on 23 November 2010. Since then, they lost only one match en route to winning the title. It was the third straight title for Barcelona manager Pep Guardiola. Lionel Messi won LaLiga Award for Best Player, which marked his third consecutive win.

The season was again dominated by Barcelona and Real Madrid, with second-place Madrid 21 points ahead of third-place Valencia. Having encountered each other in the Champions League semifinals and the Copa del Rey final, the top two teams met four times in 17 days, for a total of five times this season.

The most significant managerial change prior to the start of the season was two-time Champions League-winning José Mourinho taking over at Real Madrid.

Teams 
Real Valladolid, CD Tenerife and Xerez CD were relegated to the Segunda División after finishing the 2009–10 season in the bottom three places. Tenerife and Xerez made their immediate return to the second level after just one year in the Spanish top flight, while Valladolid ended a three-year tenure in La Liga.

The relegated teams were replaced by 2009–10 Segunda División champions Real Sociedad from San Sebastián, runners-up Hércules CF from Alicante and Levante UD from Valencia. Hércules returned to the highest Spanish football league for the first time after 13 years, while Real Sociedad and Levante terminated their second-level status after three and two years, respectively.

Stadia and locations

Personnel and sponsorship 

Barcelona makes a donation to UNICEF in order to display the charity's logo on the club's kit.

Managerial changes

League table

Results

Awards

LaLiga Awards 
La Liga's governing body, the Liga Nacional de Fútbol Profesional, honoured the competition's best players and coach with LaLiga Awards.

Top goalscorers

La Liga Champions 
This is the list of goalscorers in accordance with the LFP as organising body.

 Source: LFP, ESPN  and Liga BBVA

Pichichi Trophy 
The Pichichi Trophy is awarded by newspaper Marca to the player who scores the most goals in a season, according to its own rules (different from the ones used by FIFA) to determine the goalscorer.

 Source: Marca

Zamora Trophy 
The Zamora Trophy is awarded by newspaper Marca to the goalkeeper with least goals-to-games ratio. A goalkeeper must play at least 28 games of 60 or more minutes to be eligible for the trophy.

 Source: futbol.sportec

Fair Play award 
This award is given annually since 1999 to the team with the best fair play during the season. This ranking takes into account aspects such as cards, suspension of matches, audience behaviour and other penalties. This section not only aims to know this aspect, but also serves to break the tie in teams that are tied in all the other rules: points, head-to-head, goal difference and goals scored.

 Source: 2010–11 Fair Play Rankings Season.

 Sources of cards and penalties: Referee's reports, Competition Committee's Sanctions, Appeal Committee Resolutions and RFEF's Directory about Fair Play Rankings

Pedro Zaballa award 
Real Madrid

Season statistics

Scoring 
 First goal of the season:   Fernando Llorente for Athletic Bilbao against Hércules (28 August 2010).
 Last goal of the season:   Kennedy Bakircioglu for Racing Santander against Athletic Bilbao (21 May 2011).

Hat-tricks 

4 Player scored four goals(H) – Home ; (A) – Away

Discipline 
 First yellow card of the season:  Noé Pamarot for Hércules against Athletic Bilbao (28 August 2010)
 First red card of the season:  Matías Fritzler for Hércules against Athletic Bilbao (28 August 2010)

See also 
 List of Spanish football transfers summer 2010
 List of Spanish football transfers winter 2010–11
 2010–11 Segunda División
 2010–11 Copa del Rey

References

External links 
 

2010-11
1